Yerazgavors is a village in the Akhuryan Municipality of the Shirak Province of Armenia. It is named after the historic name of the ancient city of Shirakavan. The current village of Yerazgavors is located a few kilometres east of the historic city of Shirakavan-Yerazgavors.

Demographics

References 

World Gazeteer: Armenia – World-Gazetteer.com

Populated places in Shirak Province